Thallis Theodoris (Greek: Θαλλής Θεοδωρίδης) may refer to several Greek persons native to Elis:

Thallis Theodoridis (elder), a revolutionary leader
Thallis Theodoridis (younger), a politician

el:Θαλλής Θεοδωρίδης